A new religious movement (NRM) is a religious,  ethical, or spiritual group or community with practices of relatively modern origins. NRMs may be novel in origin or they may exist on the fringes of a wider religion, in which case they will be distinct from pre-existing denominations. Academics identify a variety of characteristics which they employ in categorizing groups as new religious movements. The term is broad and inclusive, rather than sharply defined. New religious movements are generally seen as syncretic, employing human and material assets to disseminate their ideas and worldviews, deviating in some degree from a society's traditional forms or doctrines, focused especially upon the self, and having a peripheral relationship that exists in a state of tension with established societal conventions.

A NRM may be one of a wide range of movements ranging from those with loose affiliations based on novel approaches to spirituality or religion to communitarian enterprises that demand a considerable amount of group conformity and a social identity that separates their adherents from mainstream society. Use of the term NRM is not universally accepted among the groups to which it is applied. Scholars have estimated that NRMs now number in the tens of thousands worldwide, with most in Asia and Africa. Most have only a few members, some have thousands, and very few have more than a million. Academics occasionally propose amendments to technical definitions and continue to add new groups.

List

See also 

 Governmental lists of cults and sects
 Hinduism-oriented new religious movements
 List of Christian denominations
 List of New Thought denominations and independent centers
 List of Neopagan movements
 List of religions and spiritual traditions
 List of sects in the Latter Day Saint movement
 New religious movements in the United States

Main sources

Selected sources

External links 

 Diskus The on-disk journal of international Religious Studies
 Hartford Institute of Religious Research: New religious movements
 
 Online texts about NRMs
 SSSR Resolution on New Religious Groups
 Hadden, Jeffrey K. and Douglas Cowan The New Religious Movements Homepage @The University of Virginia
 Religious Movements in the United States: An Informal Introduction

References 

~
New